Igor Nikolaevich Voronchikin (born April 14, 1938; died March 10, 2009) was a Soviet cross-country skier who competed during the early 1960s, training at Burevestnik in Moscow. He earned two bronze medals in the 1964 Winter Olympics in the 30 km and the 4x10 km relay.

References

External links

1938 births
2009 deaths
Olympic cross-country skiers of the Soviet Union
Olympic bronze medalists for the Soviet Union
Soviet male cross-country skiers
Burevestnik (sports society) athletes
Cross-country skiers at the 1964 Winter Olympics
Cross-country skiers at the 1968 Winter Olympics
Olympic medalists in cross-country skiing
Medalists at the 1964 Winter Olympics
Universiade medalists in cross-country skiing
Universiade gold medalists for the Soviet Union
Competitors at the 1962 Winter Universiade
Competitors at the 1964 Winter Universiade
Competitors at the 1966 Winter Universiade